156th meridian may refer to:

156th meridian east, a line of longitude east of the Greenwich Meridian
156th meridian west, a line of longitude west of the Greenwich Meridian